Mirror Lake is a  water body located in Carroll County in the Lakes Region of central New Hampshire, United States, in the town of Tuftonboro. The lake connects by a short outlet stream (not navigable) to Lake Winnipesaukee. The resort community of Mirror Lake, a village in the town of Tuftonboro, occupies the lake's western shore.

See also

List of lakes in New Hampshire

References

External links
Mirror Lake Protective Association
Mirror Lake WebCam

Lakes of Carroll County, New Hampshire